Perez Companc could refer to

 Gregorio Pérez Companc (born 1934), Argentine businessman
 Luís Pérez Companc (born 1972), Argentine rally driver
 Pablo Pérez Companc (born 1982)), Argentine auto racing driver
 Jorge Pérez Companc; see 2016 Dakar Rally